Acanthognathus ocellatus is a species of ant belonging to the genus Acanthognathus. Described in 1887 by Mayr, the species is native to South America and other regions.

References

Myrmicinae
Hymenoptera of South America
Insects described in 1887